Sico (died 1054) was a Byzantine protospatharios leading troops in Italy from about 1052. He had a Lombard name, though he was a Greek official. He was an official under Argyrus.

Sico was killed in battle outside the walls of Matera fighting the Normans of Humphrey of Hauteville.

Sources
Gay, Jules. L'Italie méridionale et l'empire Byzantin: Livre II. Burt Franklin: New York, 1904.

1054 deaths
Byzantine generals
11th-century Byzantine military personnel
Byzantines killed in battle
Year of birth unknown
Protospatharioi